Turkey participated in the Eurovision Song Contest 2010 with the song "We Could Be the Same" written by Evren Ozdemir, Fiona Movery Akıncı and Manga. The song was performed by Manga. The entry was selected through an internal selection organised by Turkish broadcaster Türkiye Radyo ve Televizyon Kurumu (TRT).

Before Eurovision

Internal selection 
Following Hadise's fourth place in 2009 with the song "Düm Tek Tek", several artists were rumoured in Turkish media as potential Turkish representatives for the Eurovision Song Contest 2010, including singers Murat Boz, Tarkan and Ziynet Sali. Tarkan was tipped as the favourite to represent Turkey with agreements being confirmed, however this was later denied by both TRT and the artist's management. Nazan Öncel was rumoured to be writing the Turkish Eurovision 2010 entry, however Öncel denied any contact with the broadcaster but mentioned an interest in writing a Eurovision entry for Turkey. On 22 September 2009, it was revealed that 1980 Turkish Eurovision entrant Ajda Pekkan had been approached by TRT but declined the offer as she did not want to interfere with younger artists. Five artists were later reported by the media as candidates: Deniz Arcak, Hadise, Manga, Şebnem Ferah and 2006 Turkish Eurovision entrant Sibel Tüzün, with Manga being the favourite after winning the "Best Turkish Act" and "Best European Act" at the MTV Europe Music Awards 2009. The band later stated that they were yet to be approached by TRT but would accept the offer should they receive one.

On 7 December 2009, TRT opened the suggestions for the public to nominate potential artists for consideration until 11 December 2009. Three artists were shortlisted following public input: Emre Aydın, Manga and Şebnem Ferah and were therefore approached by TRT. On 2 January 2010, Ferah declined the offer stating that Eurovision was no longer a musical contest. On 7 January 2010, TRT announced that they had reached a preliminary agreement with Manga to represent Turkey in Oslo following the refusal of Aydın. Manga was confirmed as the Turkish representative on 12 January. Three songs, all written in English, were submitted by the band to the broadcaster in February 2010 and a ten-member selection committee selected "We Could Be the Same" as the song they would perform at the contest. 

On 3 March 2010, "We Could Be the Same" was presented to the public during a press conference that took place at the TRT Tepebaşı Studios in Istanbul, broadcast on TRT 1 as well as online via the broadcaster's official website trt.net.tr. In addition to the presentation of the song, the band performed a mini concert during the press conference. The song was written by Evren Ozdemir, Fiona Movery Akıncı, as well as Manga themselves.

At Eurovision
Turkey competed in the second semi-final of the contest on 27 May, performing in the 17th slot, and qualified for the final. Turkey came 1st with 118 points: the public awarded Turkey 2nd place with 119 points and the jury awarded also 2nd place with 93 points. In the Final on 29 May, Manga came 2nd with 170 points. They performed in the 14th slot. The public awarded Turkey 2nd place with 177 points and the jury awarded 8th place with 119 points.

Voting

Points awarded to Turkey

Points awarded by Turkey

Split results by Turkey

References 

2010
Countries in the Eurovision Song Contest 2010
Eurovision